In enzymology, a [cytochrome-c]-methionine S-methyltransferase is an enzyme that catalyzes the chemical reaction

S-adenosyl-L-methionine + [cytochrome c]-methionine  S-adenosyl-L-homocysteine + [cytochrome c]-S-methyl-methionine

Thus, the two substrates of this enzyme are S-adenosyl methionine and cytochrome c methionine, whereas its two products are S-adenosylhomocysteine and cytochrome c-S-methyl-methionine.

This enzyme belongs to the family of transferases, specifically those transferring one-carbon group methyltransferases.  The systematic name of this enzyme class is S-adenosyl-L-methionine:[cytochrome c]-methionine S-methyltransferase.

References

 

EC 2.1.1
Enzymes of unknown structure